The canton of Saint-Julien-en-Genevois is an administrative division of the Haute-Savoie department, southeastern France. Its borders were modified at the French canton reorganisation which came into effect in March 2015. Its seat is in Saint-Julien-en-Genevois.

It consists of the following communes:

Archamps
Bassy
Beaumont
Bossey
Challonges
Chaumont
Chavannaz
Chêne-en-Semine
Chênex
Chessenaz
Chevrier
Chilly
Clarafond-Arcine
Clermont
Collonges-sous-Salève
Contamine-Sarzin
Desingy
Dingy-en-Vuache
Droisy
Éloise
Feigères
Franclens
Frangy
Jonzier-Épagny
Marlioz
Menthonnex-sous-Clermont
Minzier
Musièges
Neydens
Présilly
Saint-Germain-sur-Rhône
Saint-Julien-en-Genevois
Savigny
Seyssel
Usinens
Valleiry
Vanzy
Vers
Viry
Vulbens

References

Cantons of Haute-Savoie